The giant spiny skink or Poncelet's helmet skink (Tribolonotus ponceleti) is a species of lizard in the family Scincidae. The species is endemic to the Solomon Islands.

Etymology
The specific name, ponceleti, is in honor of the Rev. Jean-Baptiste Poncelet (1884-1958), French missionary and naturalist.

Habitat

Behavior
Unlike most skinks, T. ponceleti has the ability to vocalize.

Reproduction
T. ponceleti is oviparous.

References

Further reading
Austin CC, Rittmeyer EN, Richards SJ, Zug GR (2010). "Phylogeny, historical biogeography and body size evolution in Pacific Island Crocodile skinks Tribolonotus (Squamata: Scincidae)". Molecular Phylogenetics and Evolution 57: 227-236.
Kinghorn JR (1937). "A new species of scink [sic] from the Solomon Islands". Records of the Australian Museum 20 (1): 1-2 + Plate I. (Tribolonotus ponceleti, new species).
McCoy M (2006). Reptiles of the Solomon Islands. Series Faunastica No. 57. Sofia, Bulgaria: Pensoft Publishers. 212 pp.

Tribolonotus
Endemic fauna of the Solomon Islands
Reptiles described in 1937
Taxa named by James Roy Kinghorn
Taxonomy articles created by Polbot